Two ships of the Imperial Japanese Navy have been named Akitsushima, the ancient name for Japan:

  was a 2nd class protected cruiser, launched in 1892, and scrapped in 1927
  was a seaplane tender or carrier, which was completed in 1942 and sunk in 1944

The Japan Coast Guard's second Shikishima-class patrol vessel, launched in 2012, is named Akitsushima

Japanese Navy ship names
Imperial Japanese Navy ship names